Chrysoperla carnea, one of the species of common green lacewing, is an insect in the Chrysopidae family. Although the adults feed on nectar, pollen and aphid honeydew, the larvae are active predators and feed on aphids and other small insects. It has been used in the biological control of insect pests on crops.

Chrysoperla carnea was originally considered to be a single species with a holarctic distribution but it has now been shown to be a complex of many cryptic, sibling subspecies. These are indistinguishable from each other morphologically but can be recognised by variations in the vibrational songs the insects use to communicate with each other, which they especially  do during courtship.

Description
The green lacewing eggs are oval and secured to the plant by long slender stalks. They are pale green when first laid but become gray later. The larvae are about one millimetre long when they first hatch. They are brown and resemble small alligators, crawling actively around in search of prey. They have a pair of pincer-like mandibles on their head with which they grasp their prey, sometimes lifting the victim off the leaf surface to prevent its escape. The larvae inject enzymes into the bodies of their victims which digest the internal organs, after which they suck out the liquidated body fluids. The larvae grow to about eight millimetres long before they spin circular cocoons and pupate.

Adult green lacewings are a pale green colour with long, threadlike antennae and glossy, golden, compound eyes. They have a delicate appearance and are from twelve to twenty millimetres long with large, membranous, pale green wings which they fold tent-wise above their abdomens. They are weak fliers and have a fluttery form of flight. They are often seen during the evenings and at night when they are attracted by lights. The high green sensitivity of the superposition eyes allows the green lacewings to recognize fresh green leaves that they use to find honey dew produced by aphids, a site for egglaying and a resting place.

Distribution and habitat
Chrysoperla carnea is an exclusively European species. However, due to taxonomic revisions to the genus, in particular the Chrysoperla carnea species group, the exact geographic bounds of the species remain in question. As of 2009, two of the primary candidates for the true C. carnea are designated as Cc2 ("slow motorboat") and Cc4 ("motorboat"). Cc2 is the more restricted of the two candidates, only extending from central Spain north to England and east to Greece and Hungary. Cc4 is more widespread, ranging from the Southern Alps to the north through the United Kingdom and into the southern portion Fennoscandia and to the east to western or central Russia. Both candidates also differ in terms of habitat, with Cc2 being restricted to warmer elevations of below 1,000 meters whereas Cc4 is more tolerant of the cold and ranges into elevations above 1,000 meters.

Life cycle

The green lacewing adults overwinter buried in leaf litter at the edge of fields or other rough places, emerging when the weather warms up in spring. Each female lacewing lays several hundred small eggs at the rate of two to five per day, choosing concealed spots underneath leaves or on shoots near potential prey. The eggs are normally laid during the hours of darkness.

The larvae hatch in three to six days, eat voraciously and moult three times as they grow. They feed not only on aphids but also on many other types of insects and even prey on larger creatures, such as caterpillars. They can consume large numbers of prey and completely destroy aphid colonies. When food is scarce they turn cannibal and eat each other. After two to three weeks, the mature larvae secrete silk and build round, parchment-like cocoons in concealed positions on plants. From these, the adults emerge ten to fourteen days later. The length of the life cycle (under 4 weeks in summer conditions) is greatly influenced by the temperature and there may be several generations each year under favourable conditions.

Biological control
Chrysoperla carnea adults eat pollen and honeydew and are not predatory, but the larvae have been recorded as feeding on seventy different prey species in five insect orders. The prey are mostly from the order Hemiptera and are predominantly aphids on low growing vegetation. On crops, the larvae have been reported as attacking several species of aphids, red spider mites, thrips, whitefly, the eggs of leafhoppers, leaf miners, psyllids, small moths and caterpillars, beetle larvae and the tobacco budworm. They are considered to be important predators of the long-tailed mealybug under glass. C. carnea occurs naturally in many growing regions of the northern hemisphere. It is considered an important aphid predator in cotton crops in Russia and Egypt, sugar beet in Germany and vineyards in Europe. It has been found to be effective at controlling the cotton whitefly, Bemisia tabaci, in cotton crops in Pakistan. The presence of the larvae on the foliage was found to inhibit visitation and oviposition by B. tabaci which suggests the larvae may produce a volatile semiochemical which repels the whitefly.

Although the larvae are effective as biological control agents, in open air environments the adult lacewings tend to disperse widely. They may remain in the original release location if they have sources of nectar, pollen or honeydew to feed on in the general vicinity. Commercial supplies of related species, usually eggs, are available from many outlets in North America. However, no true C. carnea occurs in North America.

When attempts were made to introduce the species into India, and New Zealand between the 1920s and 1970s, the lacewings failed to become established, perhaps because of the absence of certain yeast symbionts necessary to their development which were absent from their new environments.

References

Chrysopidae
Insects used as insect pest control agents
Insects described in 1836
Neuroptera of Europe
Taxa named by James Francis Stephens